Cochamó Airport ,  is a public use airport serving Cochamó, a town in the Los Lagos Region of Chile. Cochamó is at the northern end of the Reloncaví Estuary.

The airport is just north of the town, on a bluff alongside the estuary. South approach and departures are over the water. The region is mountainous, and there is rising terrain to the east of the runway.

See also

Transport in Chile
List of airports in Chile

References

External links
OpenStreetMap - Cochamó
OurAirports - Cochamó
SkyVector - Cochamó
FallingRain - Cochamó Airport

Airports in Los Lagos Region